Stylianos Farantakis (Greek: Στυλιανος Φαραντακης; born 25 May 1995 in Chania) is a Greek cyclist.

Major results

2012
 National Junior Road Championships
1st  Time trial
3rd Road race
2013
 National Junior Road Championships
1st  Time trial
2nd Road race
2014
 1st  Road race, National Under–23 Road Championships
2015
 National Under–23 Road Championships
1st  Road race
2nd Time trial
 3rd Road race, National Road Championships
 5th Road race, UEC European Under–23 Road Championships
2016
 National Under–23 Road Championships
1st  Road race
1st  Time trial
 National Road Championships
2nd Time trial
3rd Road race
2017
 National Road Championships
2nd Road race
3rd Time trial
 8th Paris–Tours Espoirs
2018
 National Road Championships
1st  Time trial
2nd Road race
2019
 1st  Road race, National Road Championships
 4th Overall Tour of Egypt
1st Stage 3

References

1995 births
Living people
Greek male cyclists
Sportspeople from Chania
Competitors at the 2018 Mediterranean Games
Mediterranean Games competitors for Greece
21st-century Greek people